The Willits News is a twice weekly newspaper covering Willits, California and northern Mendocino County. It has been reporting on the community since 1903. It works regularly with the Ukiah Daily Journal.

Current 
The paper is owned by newspaper group Digital First Media. In late 2017 its Willits office was closed, and the paper began to operate out of the office of its mother paper, the Ukiah Daily Journal. Additionally, its editorial independence was curtailed, and it was brought under the direct control of the Ukiah Daily Journal in June 2016. The paper prints outside of Mendocino County and is trucked in for delivery.

References

External links 
Official website

1903 establishments in California
Newspapers published in California